John "Jackie" McNamara (born 19 September 1952 in Glasgow) is a Scottish retired professional footballer who played for Cumbernauld United, Celtic, Hibernian and Greenock Morton. His son, Jackie McNamara, was also a professional footballer.

Career 

McNamara started his professional career with Celtic; he was transferred to Hibernian during 1976 in exchange for Hibs legend Pat Stanton. The transfer was "roundly condemned" by the Hibs fans at the time, but McNamara proved a great servant for Hibs, particularly when he moved into defence after the sale of John Blackley. McNamara played in over 200 league games for Hibs, and was awarded a testimonial match against Newcastle United in August 1984.

McNamara was assistant manager to Jim Duffy at Hibernian during the late 1990s. McNamara left the club after Duffy was sacked in February 1998, with the team bottom of the Scottish Premier Division and heading for relegation.

The last inter-league match with a Scottish League XI side, McNamara captained the team against the Irish League XI in 1980.

Honours 

Cumbernauld United
 Central Junior League: 1970–71

Greenock Morton
 Scottish First Division: 1986–87

References 

 
 

1952 births
Living people
Footballers from Glasgow
Scottish footballers
Association football central defenders
Cumbernauld United F.C. players
Celtic F.C. players
Hibernian F.C. players
Greenock Morton F.C. players
Scottish Football League players
Greenock Morton F.C. non-playing staff
Hibernian F.C. non-playing staff
Scottish Football League representative players